Secret Story (season 4) or Secret Story 4 is the fourth season of various versions of television show Secret Story and may refer to:

 Secret Story (French season 4), the 2010 edition of the French version.
 Secret Story 4 (Portugal), the 2013 edition of the Portuguese version.